Oyuunbatyn Yesügen (born 20 June 1999) is a Mongolian sports shooter. She competed in the women's 10 metre air rifle event at the 2020 Summer Olympics.

References

External links
 

1999 births
Living people
Mongolian female sport shooters
Olympic shooters of Mongolia
Shooters at the 2020 Summer Olympics
Place of birth missing (living people)
Sportspeople from Ulaanbaatar
21st-century Mongolian women